Caesalpinioideae is a botanical name at the rank of subfamily, placed in the large family Fabaceae or Leguminosae. Its name is formed from the generic name Caesalpinia. It is known also as the peacock flower subfamily. The Caesalpinioideae are mainly trees distributed in the moist tropics, but include such temperate species as the honeylocust (Gleditsia triacanthos) and Kentucky coffeetree (Gymnocladus dioicus). It has the following clade-based definition:
The most inclusive crown clade containing Arcoa gonavensis Urb. and Mimosa pudica L., but not Bobgunnia fistuloides (Harms) J. H. Kirkbr. & Wiersema, Duparquetia orchidacea Baill., or Poeppigia procera C.Presl In some classifications, for example the Cronquist system, the group is recognized at the rank of family, Caesalpiniaceae.

Characteristics 
 Specialised extrafloral nectaries often present on the petiole and / or on the primary and secondary rachises, usually between pinnae or leaflet pairs
 Leaves commonly bipinnate
 Inflorescences globose, spicate
 Aestivation valvate
 Anthers often with a stipitate or sessile apical gland
 Pollen commonly in tetrads, bitetrads or polyads
 Seeds usually with an open or closed pleurogram on both faces
 Root nodules variably present and indeterminate

Taxonomy

 Caesalpinieae Clade

 Cassieae Clade
 Batesia Spruce
 Cassia L.
 Chamaecrista Moench
 Melanoxylum Schott
 Recordoxylon Ducke
 Senna Mill.
 Vouacapoua Aubl.
 Dimorphandra Group A
 Burkea Benth.
 Campsiandra Benth.
 Dimorphandra Schott pro parte
 Dinizia Ducke
 Mora Benth.
 Stachyothyrsus Harms
 Dimorphandra Group B
 Dimorphandra Schott pro parte
 Diptychandra Tul.
 Erythrophleum Afzel. ex R.Br.
 Moldenhawera Schrad.
 Pachyelasma Harms
 Sympetalandra Stapf
 Mimosoid clade (~40 genera)
 Peltophorum Clade
 Bussea Harms

 Colvillea Bojer ex Hook.
 Conzattia Rose
 Delonix Raf.
 Heteroflorum M. Sousa
 Lemuropisum H.Perrier
 Parkinsonia L.
 Peltophorum (Vogel) Benth.
 Schizolobium Vogel
 Tachigali Clade
 Arapatiella Rizzini & A.Mattos
 Jacqueshuberia Ducke
 Sclerolobium Vogel
 Tachigali Aubl.
 Umtiza Clade
 Acrocarpus Wight & Arn.
 Arcoa Urb.
 Ceratonia L.
 Gleditsia L.
 Gymnocladus Lam.
 Tetrapterocarpon Humbert
 Umtiza Sim
 Unassigned
 Pterogyne Tul.

Phylogenetics
Caesalpinioideae, as it was traditionally circumscribed, was paraphyletic. Several molecular phylogenies in the early 2000s showed that the other two subfamilies of Fabaceae (Faboideae and Mimosoideae) were both nested within Caesalpinioideae. Consequently, the subfamilies of Fabaceae were reorganized to make them monophyletic. Caesalpinioideae, as currently defined, contains the following subclades:

References

 
 

 
Rosid subfamilies